Lorna Kay Stewart is a retired Canadian computer scientist and discrete mathematician whose research concerns algorithms in graph theory and special classes of graphs, including cographs, permutation graphs, interval graphs, comparability graphs and their complements, well-covered graphs, and asteroidal triple-free graphs. She earned her Ph.D. in 1985 at the University of Toronto under the supervision of Derek Corneil, and is a professor emerita at the University of Alberta.

Selected publications

References

External links
Home page

Year of birth missing (living people)
Living people
Canadian computer scientists
Canadian mathematicians
Canadian women computer scientists
Canadian women mathematicians
Graph theorists
University of Toronto alumni
Academic staff of the University of Alberta